Ryoga Hirano (born 11 May 1999) is a Japanese professional kickboxer, currently competing in the featherweight division of RISE.

Combat Press ranked him as a top ten super flyweight between February and June 2022.

Kickboxing career

Early career
Hirano faced Kanta Tabuchi at KING OF SOUL vol.1 on June 16, 2019. The fight was ruled a draw. After beating Tabuchi, Hirano participated in the "Legend of Heroes" tournament, which was held between November 22 and November 24, 2019. Hirano successfully won the semifinal bout against Hoi Fai by decision, but lost a decision in turn to Lee Yelin in the tournament finals. Hirano rebounded from this loss with a second-round knockout victory against Rai at TWO FC on December 12, 2019.

RISE
Hirano made his RISE debut against Tatsuki Shinotsuka at RISE 137 on February 23, 2020. He lost the fight by a first-round knockout. Shinotsuka forced Hirano to shell up with a flurry of punches, before he floored him with a right knee to the chin.

Hirano faced Teppei Tsuda at Rise EVOL.6 on September 19, 2020. He won the closely contested bout by majority decision. Two of the judges scored the fight 29-29 after the first three rounds were contested, while the third judge scored it 29-28 for Tsuda. After an extra round was fought, Hirano was awarded a 10-9 scorecard by two of the judges, while the third one scored it as an even 10–10 draw.

Hirano faced Taisei Umei, in his third RISE appearance, at Rise 143 on November 14, 2020. Umei won the fight by unanimous decision, with all three judges scoring the fight 29–28 in his favor.

Hirano faced Fumiya at Rise EVOL.7 on January 16, 2021. He won the fight by a third-round technical knockout, after he had knocked Fumiya down thrice by the 2:38 minute mark of the opening round.

Hirano faced Keisuke Monguchi at Rise on Abema 2 on May 15, 2021. He lost the fight by unanimous decision, with scores of 30–29, 30–28 and 30–28.

After suffering his fourth professional loss, Hirano was booked to face YU-YA at Rise World Series 2021 Osaka on July 18, 2021. He won the fight by a first-round knockout, flooring YU-YA with a right hook.

Hirano next faced Shota Tezuka at Rise 152 on October 22, 2021. He won the fight by a second-round technical knockout, stopping Tezuka with leg kicks.

Hirano face the one-time RISE featherweight title challenger Masaki Takeuchi at RISE 154 on January 23, 2022. He achieved his career-best victory, as he beat Takeuchi by unanimous decision, with scores of 29–28, 29-28 and 30–29.

Hirano was booked to face Taisei Umei for the vacant RISE Featherweight title at RISE 156 on March 27, 2022. He lost the fight by majority decision, with scores of 49–49, 49–48 and 48–47.

Hirano faced Taiki Sawatani at RISE 163 on December 10, 2022. He won the fight by unanimous decision, with all three judges scoring the bout 29–28 in his favor. Hirano scored the sole knockdown of the fight in the first round, as he knocked Sawatani down with a right hook.

Championships and accomplishments

Amateur
 2011 Kennokai Amakick -45 kg Championship
 2012 NEXT LEVEL Chushikoku -50 kg Championship
 2013 All Japan Jr Kick - 50 kg Runner-up

Fight record

|-  style="background:#cfc;"
| 2022-12-10|| Win||align=left| Taiki Sawatani || RISE 163 || Tokyo, Japan || Decision (Unanimous)||  3||3:00 

|-  style="text-align:center; background:#fbb;"
| 2022-03-27|| Loss || align=left| Taisei Umei || RISE 156 || Tokyo, Japan || Decision (Majority) ||5||3:00
|-
! style=background:white colspan=9 |
|-  style="text-align:center; background:#cfc"
| 2022-01-23 || Win || align=left| Masaki Takeuchi || RISE 154 || Tokyo, Japan || Decision (Unanimous)  || 3 || 3:00 
|-
|-  style="text-align:center; background:#cfc"
| 2021-10-22 || Win || align=left| Shota Tezuka || RISE 152 || Tokyo, Japan || TKO (Leg kicks)  || 2 || 1:52 
|-
|-  style="text-align:center; background:#cfc"
| 2021-07-18 || Win || align=left| YU-YA || Rise World Series 2021 Osaka || Osaka, Japan || KO (Right hook)  || 1 || 2:45 
|-
|-  style="text-align:center; background:#fbb"
| 2021-05-16 || Loss || align=left| Keisuke Monguchi || Rise on Abema 2 || Tokyo, Japan || Decision (Unanimous)  || 3 || 3:00
|-
|-  style="text-align:center; background:#cfc"
| 2021-01-16 || Win || align=left| Fumiya || Rise EVOL.7 || Tokyo, Japan || TKO (Three knockdowns)  || 1 || 2:38 
|-
|-  style="text-align:center; background:#cfc"
| 2020-11-22 || Win || align=left| Kaku Chonbon || KING OF SOUL vol.2 || Osaka, Japan || Decision (Split)  || 3 || 3:00
|-
|-  style="text-align:center; background:#fbb"
| 2020-11-14 || Loss || align=left| Taisei Umei || Rise 143 || Tokyo, Japan || Decision (Unanimous)  || 3 || 3:00
|-
|-  style="text-align:center; background:#cfc"
| 2020-09-19 || Win || align=left| Teppei Tsuda || Rise EVOL.6 || Osaka, Japan || Ext. R. Decision (Majority)  || 3 || 3:00
|-
|-  style="text-align:center; background:#fbb"
| 2020-02-23 || Loss || align=left| Tatsuki Shinotsuka || Rise 137 || Tokyo, Japan || KO (Right knee)  || 1|| 1:50
|-
|-  style="text-align:center; background:#cfc"
| 2019-12-22 || Win || align=left| Rai || TWO FC || Kobe, Japan || KO (Right hook)  || 2 || 2:46
|-
|-  style="text-align:center; background:#fbb"
| 2019-11-24 || Loss || align=left| Li Yelin || Legend of Heroes, Semifinals || Shenzhen, China || Decision (unanimous)  || 3 || 3:00

|-  style="text-align:center; background:#cfc"
| 2019-11-23 || Win || align=left| Fei Hui || Legend of Heroes, Tournament Quarterfinals|| Shenzhen, China || Decision  || 3 || 3:00
|-
|-  style="text-align:center; background:#c5d2ea"
| 2019-06-16 || Draw || align=left| Kanta Tabuchi || KING OF SOUL vol.1 || Osaka, Japan || Decision  || 3 || 3:00
|-
|-  style="text-align:center; background:#cfc"
| 2019-05-19 || Win || align=left| Kaiyasit Chuwattana ||  || Japan || Decision  || 3 || 3:00
|-
| colspan=9 | Legend:    

|- style="background:#cfc;"
| 2016-04-10 || Win || align="left" | Satoshi Kawai || NJKF West Japan YOUNG FIGHT 1st || Osaka, Japan || Decision (Majority) || 3 || 2:00
|- style="text-align:center; background:#cfc;"
| 2016-01-31|| Win || align="left" | Naoya Nakamura || NEXT☆LEVEL Chushikoku 19 || Okayama, Japan || KO|| 1 || 
|- style="background:#cfc;"
| 2014-12-07 || Win || align="left" | Yuta Masuda || NEXT☆LEVEL Chushikoku 14 || Kurashiki, Japan || KO || 1 || 
|- style="background:#fbb;"
| 2014-11-02 || Loss || align="left" | Tsukasa Nijo  || NJKF 2014 7th || Osaka, Japan || Ext. R. Decision (Unanimous) || 4 || 2:00
|- style="background:#cfc;"
| 2014-08-10 || Win || align="left" | Kei Ishiguro || NJKF: Professional Young Fight x5 || Kurashiki, Japan || KO || 1 || 
|- style="background:#fbb;"
| 2014-04-27 || Loss || align="left" | Taiki Sawatani || NEXT☆LEVEL Chushikoku 13 || Kurashiki, Japan || Decision (Unanimous) || 2 || 2:00
|-
! style=background:white colspan=9 |
|-
|- style="background:#fbb;"
| 2013-05-12 || Loss || align="left" | Ryo Sato || DEEP KICK 15 || Osaka, Japan || Decision (Unanimous) || 3 || 2:00
|-
! style=background:white colspan=9 |
|- style="background:#fbb;"
| 2013-03-31 || Loss || align="left" | Tenshin Nasukawa  || 2013 All Japan Jr. Kick Tournament, Tournament Finals || Tokyo, Japan || KO (Knee) || 1 || 
|-
! style=background:white colspan=9 |
|- style="background:#cfc;"
| 2013-03-31 || Win || align="left" | Hiroaki Okae  || 2013 All Japan Jr. Kick Tournament, Tournament Semifinals || Tokyo, Japan || Decision || 2 || 2:00
|- style="background:#cfc;"
| 2013-03-31 || Win || align="left" | Shoya Suzuki  || 2013 All Japan Jr. Kick Tournament, Tournament Quarterfinals || Tokyo, Japan || Decision || 2 || 2:00
|-
|- style="background:#cfc;"
| 2013-01-13 || Win|| align="left" | Ryuki Endo|| NEXT☆LEVEL Chushikoku 9 || Kurashiki, Japan || KO || 1 || 
|-
|- style="background:#cfc;"
| 2012-11-04 || Win || align="left" | Renya Ishigami  || NJKF: Kick to The Future 8 || Kurashiki, Japan || Decision (Unanimous) || 3 || 2:00
|-
|- style="background:#cfc;"
| 2012-07-29 || Win || align="left" | Kyosuke Nishida  || NJKF || Kurashiki, Japan || Decision (Unanimous) || 3 || 2:00
|-
! style=background:white colspan=9 |
|- style="text-align:center; background:#fbb;"
| 2012-04-15|| Loss || align="left" | || 2012 All Japan Jr. Kick Tournament, Quarter Final || Tokyo, Japan || Decision || 2 ||2:00

|- style="background:#c5d2ea;"
| 2012-03-04 || Draw || align="left" | Yahiro Kawahigashi || DOUBLE IMPACT 2 || Chiba, Japan || Decision (Split) || 2 || 2:00
|- style="background:#cfc;"
| 2011-12-24 || Win || align="left" | Ko Tee Han || DEEP KICK 9 || Osaka, Japan|| TKO (Punches) || 1 || 0:44
|- style="background:#fbb;"
| 2011-10-23 || Loss || align="left" | Ryo Sato || DEEP KICK 8 || Osaka, Japan || Decision (Unanimous) || 3 || 2:00
|-
! style=background:white colspan=9 |
|- style="background:#cfc;"
| 2011-07-31 || Win || align="left" | Yusuke Yamada  || DEEP KICK 7 || Osaka, Japan|| Decision (Unanimous) || 2 || 2:00
|- style="background:#fbb;"
| 2011-04-17 || Loss || align="left" | Urakami Shanghai  || New Japan Blood 4 || Okayama, Japan|| Decision (Majority) || 2 || 2:00
|- style="background:#cfc;"
| 2011-02-27 || Win || align="left" | Yuki Kuremoto  || Kennokai Amakick 4, Tournament Finals || Okayama, Japan|| Decision (Unanimous) || 2 || 2:00
|-
! style=background:white colspan=9 |
|- style="background:#cfc;"
| 2011-02-27 || Win || align="left" | Nagisa Nitani || Kennokai Amakick 4, Tournament Semifinals || Okayama, Japan|| Decision (Unanimous) || 2 || 1:30
|-
|- style="background:#cfc;"
| 2010-10-10 || Win || align="left" | Shun Yoriki || Kennokai Amakick 3 || Okayama, Japan|| KO  || 2 || 
|-
|- style="background:#cfc;"
| 2010-07-18 || Win || align="left" | Takumi Seki  || Kennokai Amakick 2 || Okayama, Japan|| Decision (Unanimous) || 2 || 2:00 
|-
|- style="background:#c5d2ea;"
| 2010-04-24 || Draw || align="left" | Toki Matsui || Kennokai Amakick 1 || Okayama, Japan|| Decision (Unanimous) || 2 || 2:00 
|-
|- style="background:#c5d2ea;"
| 2010-04-24 || Draw || align="left" | Tsubasa Yoshikawa || Kennokai Amakick 1 || Okayama, Japan|| Decision (Unanimous) || 2 || 2:00 
|-
| colspan=9 | Legend:

See also
 List of male kickboxers

References

Japanese kickboxers
1999 births
Living people
Japanese male kickboxers
People from Kurashiki
Sportspeople from Okayama Prefecture